The 2007 Mid-Eastern Athletic Conference  men's basketball tournament took place on March 6–10, 2007 at the RBC Center in Raleigh, North Carolina. The championship game was televised by ESPN Classic.

Bracket

Asterisk denotes game ended in overtime.

References

MEAC men's basketball tournament
2006–07 Mid-Eastern Athletic Conference men's basketball season